Acxiom (pronounced "ax-ee-um") is a Conway, Arkansas-based database marketing company. The company collects, analyzes and sells customer and business information used for targeted advertising campaigns. The company was formed in 2018 when Acxiom Corporation (since renamed LiveRamp) spun off its Acxiom Marketing Services (AMS) division to global advertising network Interpublic Group of Companies.

The company has offices in the United States, Europe and Asia.

History

The business that became Acxiom was founded in 1969 as Demographics, Inc. by Charles D. Ward in Conway, Arkansas. In 1988 it became Acxiom Corporation, and by 2012, the New York Times reported that the company had the world’s largest commercial database on consumers.

On May 14, 2014, Acxiom Corporation announced that it had acquired LiveRamp, a data onboarding company, for $310 million.

In January 2017, Acxiom Corporation launched Audience Cloud, an anonymous targeting tool that allowed demographic segmentation of customers without revealing their actual identities.

In February 2018, Acxiom Corporation announced a reorganization into two divisions - Acxiom Marketing Solutions (AMS) and LiveRamp. In July, advertising company Interpublic Group of Companies (IPG) announced they were buying Acxiom Corporation's AMS business for $2.3 billion. In September, Acxiom Corporation officially changed its name to LiveRamp, allowing the AMS business owned by IPG to keep the Acxiom name. Also in September, the company introduced an open data framework allowing clients to combine online and offline data sources.

In December 2019, Acxiom integrated its data on AWS Data Exchange.

Business
Acxiom provides anonymized customer data to marketers, allowing the delivery of more relevant ads to consumers, with more effective measurement. 

Acxiom's client base in the United States consists primarily of companies in the financial, insurance and investment services, automotive, retail, telecommunications, healthcare, travel, entertainment, non-profit and government sectors.

Products

Audience Cloud identifies anonymous audience segments, and matches them with publications to display targeted ads when a member of the audience visits a particular site. 
Global Data Navigator service allows agencies to select global data elements by country. 
InfoBase is the company's brokered warehouse of consumer data.
Personicx is a customer segmentation tool. 
Unified Data Layer (UDL) uses cloud architecture to help firms connect online and offline data, to better identify consumers' identities, with a goal of complying with GDPR privacy laws.

Locations
Acxiom's headquarters is located in Conway, Arkansas, United States. The company has additional U.S. offices in Austin, Texas, Downer's Grove, Illinois and New York, New York.  International offices are located in the United Kingdom, Germany, Poland, and China.

References

External links

Business intelligence companies
Data collection
Information privacy
Technology companies of the United States
Companies based in Arkansas
Business services companies established in 2018
Technology companies established in 2018
2018 establishments in Arkansas